Charles Mengel Allen (November 22, 1916 – January 4, 2000) was a United States district judge of the United States District Court for the Western District of Kentucky.

Education and career

Born in Louisville, Kentucky, Allen received a Bachelor of Arts degree from Yale University in 1941 and a Bachelor of Laws from the University of Louisville School of Law in 1943. He was in private practice from 1944 to 1945, and was teacher at Arizona Desert School in Tucson, Arizona, from 1945 to 1946, returning to private practice in Louisville, from 1946 to 1955. He was an Assistant United States Attorney for the Western District of Kentucky from 1955 to 1959, and was again in private practice in Louisville from 1959 to 1961. He was a judge of the Jefferson County Circuit Court, Fourth Chancery Division from 1961 to 1971.

Federal judicial service

On November 17, 1971, Allen was nominated by President Richard Nixon to a seat on the United States District Court for the Western District of Kentucky vacated by Judge Henry Luesing Brooks. Allen was confirmed by the United States Senate on November 23, 1971, and received his commission on November 30, 1971. He served as Chief Judge from 1977 to 1985, assuming senior status on October 1, 1985 and serving in that capacity until his death on January 4, 2000, in Louisville.

References

Sources

External links

1916 births
2000 deaths
20th-century American lawyers
20th-century American judges
Kentucky lawyers
Kentucky state court judges
Judges of the United States District Court for the Western District of Kentucky
United States district court judges appointed by Richard Nixon
Lawyers from Louisville, Kentucky
University of Louisville School of Law alumni
Assistant United States Attorneys
Yale School of Art alumni